Amanda Tanen (born Amanda Sommers) is a fictional character in the American dramedy series Ugly Betty and spin-off web-series Mode After Hours. She is played by Becki Newton. Like Henry Grubstick, Amanda shares a last name with a real-life member of Ugly Betty's production staff — writer Brian Tanen.

Background
Amanda Tanen is the beautiful receptionist at MODE magazine, born 14 January 1982, and is allied with both Wilhelmina Slater and Wilhelmina's assistant Marc St. James when it comes to taking down the two major thorns in Wilhelmina's side; Betty Suarez and Betty's boss Daniel Meade (with whom Amanda is in love). Amanda was raised in the Hamptons on Long Island, although her parents now live in Scarsdale. Believed to be the daughter of an investment banker who, as she hinted in an earlier episode, is an embezzler, she learned in the season one finale that she is actually the daughter of the late Fey Sommers. Her uncle is the "thin one" out of the Three Tenors. Amanda aspires to marry royalty, preferably a duke, as a prince "would be too much pressure". Curious about her past, Amanda decides to seek out the identity of her father. Amanda presumed her father to be KISS bassist and lead singer Gene Simmons.
Amanda has a tendency to go on eating binges whenever she feels threatened, as a way to control her fears and insecurities. This issue is expected to be addressed in future episodes, where it is learned her past involves uncontrollable eating habits and attempts to be the "perfect" woman. Despite her somewhat conceited and ditzy exterior she is quite bright, but has a tendency to butcher the Spanish language, using mangled pronunciations like "hoe-la" (hōʹlä) for hola and "bareo" (bârʹē-ō) for barrio, and like Betty, she too found herself becoming the victim of a prank herself when a rival employee sent her a hobble dress Amanda thought came from a designer. She even had a romantic fling with a closeted straight designer named Tavares, but would end it after he took advantage of her generosity.

Prior to working at MODE, Amanda was an actress, and appeared as a hostess in a commercial for a Medieval themed restaurant. This is an inside joke, referencing an Olive Garden commercial in which Becki Newton, who plays Amanda, appeared as one of the restaurant chain's cheery hostesses before her fame on Ugly Betty.

In the first season finale, she was trapped in Fey Sommers' secret room ("love dungeon") with Christina McKinney after which they consequently got drunk and began confessing secrets to each other. Though most of Amanda's revelations initially revolved around her sexcapades (to which Christina responds in one scene, "Your special place was ruined years ago"). Another scene hints she might have bisexual tendencies when she asked Christina if she wanted to kiss (earlier in the season she appeared very pleased when the chance of a threesome with Daniel and a female model arose, though this may have been due to her feelings for Daniel). She later revealed to Christina the late Sommers was a friend of her family and her father had appealed to Fey for help in getting Amanda a job at MODE after her career as an actress didn't pan out. As Christina marvelled at this whilst stumbling around drunk, she uncovered a red safe hidden under a scarf and the pair managed to get it open (using Sommers' genuine measurements as the combination). Instead of money inside, a bunch of photos of Amanda as a child are uncovered, as well as a diary and a genuine birth certificate, naming Sommers as Amanda's biological mother.

At the start of the second season, it is shown she had temporarily gained weight in an attempt to supplement her worry and frustration with candy, which was brought on after learning of her parentage. She also became the caretaker of her late mother's pet dog, Halston, as most of Fey's possessions were given away at auction for charity. In the episode "Grin and Bear It", Wilhelmina threatens her and describes her as a "blond receptionist on the twenty-eighth floor", to which Amanda admits that she is not a natural blond. Wilhelmina also reveals that Amanda was conceived at Studio 54, during the party celebrating Fey's first issue of MODE. At the wedding of Wilhelmina and Bradford she sang the song "Milkshake" by Kelis and had the whole reception clapping with her. She also became involved with rival employee Nick Pepper, whose "dislike" between each other is a turn-on.

She also discovered the truth about what Fey did to Claire Meade  resulting in Fey's murder by Claire. After discovering several diary pages kept hidden in the back of a portrait of Fey in the Love Dungeon, Amanda learned Fey was responsible for poisoning a perfume she gave to Bradford so he can give it to Claire as a gift. When Claire began to use it, the perfume would make Claire go crazy, resulting in her killing Fey instead. Amanda wanted to get back at Claire for having killed her mother by forcing Marc to burn the pages and get rid of the perfume Claire gave to Betty after she spots it on Betty's desk, only to have Marc tell her it was Fey who killed herself. Realizing this, she turns over the evidence to Betty at Claire's trial, resulting in Claire being set free.

In the third season, Amanda's spending lifestyle would catch up with her. After being evicted from her apartment and accumulating debt, she ends up moving in with Betty at her apartment, where Betty would give her a wake-up call over her financial responsibilities, which resulted in Amanda acquiring a second job at a fast-food restaurant. After realising she had been taking advantage of Betty, Amanda began to thaw to Betty, and began treating her better, though still affectionately mocks her. During the financial struggles at MODE Amanda was made redundant, she was re-instated when Calvin Hartley invests in the company in order to save it from bankruptcy.

As the fourth season began, Amanda would finally bury the hatchet with Claire over Fey, and agreed to help Claire with establishing a relationship with Claire's son Tyler, who she gave up for adoption because he was the product of an affair between Claire and Calvin, who by the way, is also the father of Matt Hartley, whom she began to pursue after he and Betty broke up, only to end it after she realized that Matt still had feelings for Betty. Amanda later sleeps with Daniel; however, they realize that it only occurred out of impulse, later saying that they were "there for each other and that was it".

She is present at Betty's farewell party, last seen dancing with Betty and Marc - her best friends. Her final line of dialogue is: "I love this song!"

Amanda's favorite "fall color" is pale carmine.

Family life 
In the wake of discovering the truth about her mother, Amanda tried to find out more about her connection to Fey Sommers as she stands to inherit the late editor's fortune and to find out why her adoptive parents kept the truth from her all these years. The Tanens explained Fey was focused on her career at the time and didn't think she would be able to devote her efforts in raising Amanda.

With the fact Fey had carried a long-term affair with Bradford Meade, Amanda worried Bradford may be her biological father since it would mean she had committed incest by sleeping with Daniel, who would be her half-brother. She expressed this concern to Daniel, right before reading the results of a DNA test showing they were not related.

The search for her biological father has been Amanda's priority throughout season 2. In "Grin and Bear It", she learned from Wilhelmina (who was Fey's assistant and confidant) that she was conceived at Studio 54 during a celebration honoring Fey's first issue as editor-in-chief of Mode. With leads on her search, which led to her attempts to contact Kiss frontman Gene Simmons in "A Thousand Words By Friday", with Marc's help, she wrote and performed a song ("Gene Simmons is My Daddy") in hopes to catch the attention of someone in Simmons' camp - but as luck would have it, Simmons himself showed up to watch Amanda's performance. This led to a reality show called "Daddy's Little Girl" about their life as father and daughter. However, Amanda later learned that Simmons was only pretending to be her father to gain publicity.

The identity of Amanda's father was finally revealed to be a gay soap opera star named Spencer Cannon in "The Past Presents The Future", when Amanda unknowingly sets him and Marc together on a date.

Connections
Betty Suarez - Executive Assistant to the Editor in Chief at MODE; Amanda has wanted to get rid of Betty from the beginning, believing that Betty stole a job that should have been hers - assistant to Daniel Meade. She schemed to get rid of Betty by any and all means, so she could get her job and win Daniel's affection and admiration. After Betty agreed to take Sofia Reyes' job offer, Amanda replaced her temporarily as Daniel's assistant. In the episode "In or Out" she realized the assistant job was better suited to Betty and returned to her receptionist's desk with a pay raise. Despite her frequently taking jabs at Betty, the two seem to like each other and at times look to be friends. Betty is the only person to have seen Amanda crying after she ended her affair with Daniel. Amanda always seems interested in Betty's love life; she was with Betty when she found out Walter wanted Betty to move in with him. She also has fun tormenting Betty about her crush on Henry, calling him her "Nerd Lover." In the episode "Crush'd" she becomes Betty's roommate and despite the ups and downs, both begin to bond slowly, Amanda taking the responsibility of paying half of the rent and Betty starting to take her advice seriously. For the fourth season they are shown to be good friends and Betty even invites Amanda to Hilda's bachelorette trip to London.
Daniel Meade - Editor-In-Chief at MODE; He sees Amanda as another one-night stand—he slept with her but forgot about it the following day—and Amanda has been frustrated by his continual womanizing. After Daniel lost an expensive watch and sent Betty looking for it at the apartments of his past week's conquests, Betty turned up empty handed while Amanda had it with her the entire time. Daniel gave Betty a list of names, addresses and the day of the week he was with that girl. He had forgotten to list one night of the week and it was the night he was with Amanda. She finally admitted she had the watch and asked Betty to not tell Daniel. Since he never figured out which girl it was, Amanda came forward and she finally relinquished the possibility of a serious relationship with him. Her past feelings for Daniel have caused problems for proving her loyalty to Wilhelmina and Marc. Amanda feared Daniel may be her half-brother as she suspected Daniel's father Bradford may be her father, but the results came back negative. In the fourth season, episode 8 "The Bahamas Triangle", Daniel consoles her for the affair of Matt, and they spent the night together. From then they become lovers again and, after Marc, who got a promotion from Wilhelmina (after being Daniel's assistant, and once again getting his old job back) as her new Junior Fashion Editor, Amanda becomes Daniel's assistant, as she said that she is the most perfect assistant for him- she knows him well and they are already lovers (or fun buddies as Amanda says), so he won't be distracted by wondering should he or should he not sleep with his gorgeous assistant, which he would probably have. They become closer and Daniel agrees to spend the night at her house without sexual implications. After she met Tyler, Daniel's half brother, she realizes that she must end her relationship with Daniel. After an initial opposition from Daniel, he ends up accepting Amanda's love for his half brother, though not so easily.
Marc St. James - Executive Assistant to Wilhelmina Slater at MODE and Amanda's frequent co-conspirator in plans to humiliate Betty and sabotage her work. They have a co-dependent relationship; she often pretended to be his girlfriend to help him hide from his mother that he was gay, and he has taken risks to protect her job from Wilhelmina. The two shared a rowdy Thanksgiving in the office together, drinking champagne, playing with couture gowns, and placing a prank phone call to the mysterious bandaged woman, which placed both their jobs in jeopardy. In a scene at Tavares' party, Marc claims Amanda had a huge crush on him when he first started working at MODE, before she realised he was gay, but she insisted she kept staring at him only because he had a discoloured tooth at the time.
Christina McKinney - British Seamstress at MODE; Amanda frequently calls her "Braveheart" because she's Scottish. They have an antipathetic relationship; in "Fake Plastic Snow" Christina told "Santa Claus" she wishes that Amanda had "a brain". She was with Amanda when she discovered Fey Sommers was her mother.
Sofia Reyes - Editor in Chief at MYW; In Trust, Lust, and Must she became the catalyst for Amanda's realization a relationship with Daniel was not possible. After discovering that Sofia was actually using Daniel as a stunt promotion for her new magazine ("Sofia's Choice"), Amanda took revenge on Sofia by viciously beating her with her purse in the elevator where Sofia and Daniel first met ("Trust").
Nick Pepper - Amanda took an instant dislike to Nick, partly because he wouldn't go out with her. She feels she's better suited for his job as Alexis' PA. So using the same tactics she used to unsuccessfully try and take Betty's job, Amanda attempts to strong-arm her way into forcing Nick out of his by convincing Alexis she should pick her over Nick. In the episode Bananas for Betty, after shooting Nick in a paintball game, Amanda and Nick end up making out.
Fey Sommers - Daniel Meade's predecessor as Editor-In-Chief at MODE; in the finale of the first season, while locked in Fey Sommer's "Love Dungeon", Amanda discovers childhood photos of her and a birth certificate declaring Fey as Amanda's mother.
Bradford Meade - CEO of Meade Publications; because of his affair with Fey Sommers, Amanda suspected he may be her biological father, but it turned out he was not.
Henry Grubstick - Accountant at Meade Publications; along with Marc, Amanda likes to torture him, especially when it involves Betty or when they demand their paychecks...as long as they don't endure his wrath (as they did in "Betty's Wait Problem").
Wilhelmina Slater - Co-editor-in-chief at Mode. She is one of the connections and was an assistant to her biological mother Fey.
Spencer Cannon - Amanda's biological father. He is a soap opera actor who hired Amanda as his personal stylist, but he actually knew that Amanda was his daughter because he found her through an adoption agency. Marc originally found out that he is Amanda's biological father because he saw the Tweety Bird tattoo on his lower back.

Notes

References

Ugly Betty characters
Adoptee characters in television
Fictional actors
Fictional cheerleaders
Fictional secretaries
Fictional receptionists
Fictional characters from New York (state)
Television characters introduced in 2006